The 1992 Kazakhstan Top Division was the inaugural season of the Top Division, now called the Kazakhstan Premier League, the highest football league competition in Kazakhstan.

League format

Originally planned 25 teams in total. But withdrawal of Metallurg after couple of games and which results were annulled cut Group A one team fewer.

It was split into two stages. In first stage two groups of 11 and 13 teams were formed.  In second stage the best seven teams of each group joined together to play in a final group for positions 1 to 14. The rest of the teams played in a group for positions 15 to 24. Teams played against each other on home-away basis in their groups. Final standings of teams did not count the results of the first stage.

Teams in the 1991 Soviet football season 
1991 Soviet First League
 «Kairat» (Alma-Ata) - 14th place

1991 Soviet Second League

 «Vostok» (Ust-Kamenogorsk) - 5th place
 «Tselinnik» (Akmola) - 8th place
 «Traktor» (Pavlodar) - 9th place
 «Shakhter» (Karaganda) - 10th place
 «Fosfor» (Dzhambul) - 11th place
 «Zhiger» (Chimkent) - 12th place
 «Ekibastuzets» (Ekibastuz) - 18th place
 «Zhetysu» (Taldy-Kurgan) - 21st place

1991 Soviet Second League B 

 «Aktyubinets» (Aktiubinsk) - 1st place
 «Spartak» (Semipalatinsk) - 2nd place
 «Khimik» (Kustanai) - 3rd place
 «Kaisar» (Kyzyl-Orda) - 4th place
 «Metallurg» (Dzhezkazgan) - 5th place
 «Gornyak» (Khromtau) - 6th place
 «Metallist» (Petropavlovsk) - 8th place
 «Bolat» (Temirtau) - 9th place
 «Kokshetau» (Kokchetav) - 11th place
 «Montazhnik» (Turkestan) - 12th place
 «Arman» (Kentau) - 13th place
 «Aktau» (Aktau) - 15th place
 «Uralets» (Uralsk) - 17th place

Teams without the Soviet status of "teams of masters" (professional teams)

 «Arsenal-SKIF» (Chimkent)
 «Zenit» (Kokchetav)
 CSKA (Alma-Ata)

Group A

Group B

First round

Group A

League table

Results

Group B

League table

Results

Second round

Championship round

League table

Results

Relegation round

League table

Results

Statistics

Top scorers

See also
Kazakhstan national football team 1992

References

External links
 Kazakhstan 1992. RSSSF
 The First football championship of Kazakhstan in 1992. Top League (I ЧЕМПИОНАТ КАЗАХСТАНА ПО ФУТБОЛУ - 1992. ВЫСШАЯ ЛИГА). Kazakhstan Football. 

Kazakhstan Premier League seasons
1992 in Kazakhstani football
Kazakh
Kazakh